Watson Brown may refer to:
 Watson Brown (American football) (born 1950), retired American football coach and former player
 Watson Brown (abolitionist) (1835–1859), son of the abolitionist John Brown
 Elizabeth Watson-Brown (born 1956/1957), Australian politician

See also
 Watson T. Browne, English singer